This article shows a list of cities in Denmark by population. The population is measured by Statistics Denmark for urban areas (Danish: Byområder), defined as a contiguous built-up area with a maximum distance of 200 meters between houses, unless further distance is caused by public areas, cemeteries or similar. Furthermore, to obtain the status of being a city (byområde), the area must have at least 200 inhabitants. Smaller settlements are by Danmarks Statistik included in numbers for rural areas (landdistrikter). 

The largest urban area is the Hovedstadsområdet, the metropolitan area of Copenhagen.

See also
List of urban areas in Sweden by population
List of towns and cities in Norway
List of urban areas in the Nordic countries
World's largest cities
List of municipalities of Denmark

References and notes

External links 

 
Cities
Denmark
Denmark